The chicken ovalbumin upstream promoter transcription factor (COUP-TFs) proteins are members of the nuclear receptor family of intracellular transcription factors.

COUP-TFs play critical roles in the development of organisms.

References

External links
 
 
 

Intracellular receptors
Transcription factors